The Tai Solarin University of Education is a state university of education in Nigeria. It was established in 2005. It is located in Ijagun, Ijebu-Ode, Ogun State.

History
The university was named after the Nigerian educational administrator and human rights activist Tai Solarin (1922–1994).  It is the 76th approved university in Nigeria. 
The Tai Solarin University of Education (TASUED, pronounced TARSUD), was proclaimed a full-fledged university (and a transformation of the erstwhile Tai Solarin College of Education, established January 1978), on 29 January 2005 by the administration of Otunba Gbenga Daniel.
 
TASUED was officially approved as a university by the National Universities Commission (NUC) on Tuesday 28 November 2005. It is a citadel of learning dedicated to the production of competent professional educators and teachers who have immense knowledge of their chosen subjects/disciplines of study and the requisite pedagogical skills of subject delivery. The University is unique in that, from inception, it incorporated a four-year mandatory vocational and entrepreneurial study into the curriculum of its B.Ed, B.Sc(Ed),B.Sc and B.A (Ed) programmes such that students are awarded two certificates at graduation; one in their chosen course of study and the other a proficiency certificate in the vocational and entrepreneurial study. Furthermore, a sequel to the NUC Resource Assessment exercise in April 2019, the Commission in addition to the existing programmes (undergraduate and postgraduate) granted the university the approval to establish some postgraduate programmes and the full-time mode of some undergraduate programmes. In all, 59 programmes were newly approved: 33 PhD programmes, 13 M.A, M.Sc, M.A(Ed) and M.Sc(Ed) programmes and 13 B.A and B.Sc programmes.

Vice Chancellors
The Vice Chancellors of the University since its founding are as follows:
 Professor Olukayode Oyesiku
 Professor Segun Awonusi
 Professor Oluyemisi Oluremi Obilade
 Professor Abayomi Arigbabu 
 Professor Oluwole Sikiru Banjo (Acting)

Colleges

The university has five colleges for its undergraduate programmes and a postgraduate college.

College of Specialised and Professional Education (COSPED)
College of Science and Information Technology (COSIT)
College of Humanities (COHUM)
College of Social and Management Sciences (COSMAS)
College of Vocational and Technology Education (COVTED)
The Postgraduate College (TPC)

Campus and hostels
The university has halls and auditoriums such as the Otunba Gbenga Daniel Auditorium, university (e-learning) block, Alex O. Onabanjo Complex, CEPEP building, the Science Complex, and the Lecture Theatre. It also has halls of residence (hostels) for students. Students also reside in hostels built by the residents of the local communities such as Ijagun, Ijele, Imaweje, and Ijebu Ode. Mosun Filani and Tobi Oyinlola are notable alumni of the university.

Occupy TASUED 
A new government came to power in Ogun State in 2011 led by Senator Ibikunle Amosun and attempted to scrap TASUED. Students of the institution rose up against the decision and formed the #OccupyTASUED campaign.

On February 14, 2012, on one of their trips to the state house in Oke-Mosan Abeokuta, the bus conveying TASUED supporters got its tyre punctured and rolled over twice. The accident inflicted injuries on many and eventually caused the death of Olatunji Fashina aka Humble TeeJay. Layemi, Azeez Agboola (Olofin), Ishola Adebayo Crown, Owoblow, Tola Ben, and few others were also on the bus that was involved in the accident.

Today, Tunji Fashina is being honoured as a hero of the successful struggle ’cause he paid the huge price with his life. The Students Union Govt (SUG) building got named after him.

Notable alumni 

Mosun Filani (Actress)
Glory Onome Nathaniel (Athlete)
Olamide (Artist)

External links

References

Education in Ogun State
Educational institutions established in 2005
Public universities in Nigeria
2005 establishments in Nigeria
Teachers colleges